The FAI Cup 1928–29 was the eighth edition of Ireland's premier cup competition, The Football Association of Ireland Challenge Cup or FAI Cup. The tournament began on 5 January 1929 and concluded on 6 April with the final replay held at Shelbourne Park, Dublin. An official attendance of approximately 15,000 people watched Shamrock Rovers win the first of five FAI Cup titles in a row by defeating holders Bohemians.

First round

Second round

Semi-finals

Final

Replay

Notes
A.  From 1923-1936, the FAI Cup was known as the Free State Cup.

B.  Attendances were calculated using gate receipts which limited their accuracy as a large proportion of people, particularly children, attended football matches in Ireland throughout the 20th century for free by a number of means.

References

External links
FAI Website

1928-29
1928–29 domestic association football cups
1928–29 in Irish association football